The Great Falls Tribune is a daily morning newspaper printed in Helena, Montana. It is one of Montana's largest newspaper companies.

History 
The first edition of the newspaper then called the Weekly Tribune was printed on May 14, 1885.

Starting on May 16, 1887, the Tribune became a daily newspaper.

On May 19, 1890, delivery switched from afternoon to morning.

The Great Falls Tribune moved to a new printing facility on 2nd Street in 1916; it remained there until 1979, when it moved to the location at 205 River Drive South. In 2022, they moved to a warehouse space at 701 River Dr S #1. 

The Tribune launched a subsidiary company, River's Edge Printing in 2006; the latter printed for weekly newspapers on a Goss Community press.

In July 2020, printing of the Great Falls Tribune moved to the presses of the Independent Record in Helena.

Awards 
The Great Falls Tribune won the Pulitzer Prize for Explanatory Reporting in 2000 for a yearlong series on alcoholism.

References

External links

 

Newspapers published in Montana
Great Falls, Montana
Gannett publications
1884 establishments in Montana Territory
Publications established in 1884